Xestocasis balanochrysa is a species of moth of the  family Oecophoridae. It is found in Australia.

References

Moths described in 1915
Oecophorinae